FBG may refer to:

 Fiber Bragg grating
 Fredericksburg station, Amtrak code FBG
 Simmons Army Airfield, North Carolina, US